Brose is a surname. Notable people with the surname include:

Dario Brose (born 1970), American soccer player
Don Brose (born 1940), American ice hockey coach
Henry Brose (1890–1965), Australian physicist
Katja Brose, American neuroscientist
Richard Brose (1897–1969), Australian politician